The following Confederate Army units and commanders fought in the Battle of Camp Wildcat (also known as Wildcat Mountain and Camp Wild Cat) of the American Civil War on October 21, 1861, in Laurel County, Kentucky. The Union order of battle is listed separately.

Abbreviations used

Military rank
 BG = Brigadier General

Confederate Army
BG Felix K. Zollicoffer

See also

 Kentucky in the American Civil War

References
 Battle, J. H., et al. Kentucky: A History of the State (Louisville, KY: F. A. Battey, 1885).
 Lindsley, John B. The Military Annals of Tennessee, Confederate: First Series (Nashville, TN: J. M. Lindsley & Co.), 1886.
 The Official Records of the War of the Rebellion, Ser. 1, Vol. 4, pp. 280–316.

External links
 National Park Service, Daniel Boone National Forest, Camp Wildcat battle site, photos, and description
 National Park Service Battle Summary
 Camp Wildcat Preservation Foundation

American Civil War orders of battle